Cerace is a genus of moths belonging to the subfamily Tortricinae of the family Tortricidae.

Species
Cerace anthera Diakonoff, 1950
Cerace charidotis Razowski, 1992
Cerace cyanopyga Diakonoff, 1950
Cerace diehli Buchsbaum & Miller, 2002
Cerace euchrysa Diakonoff, 1974
Cerace ios Diakonoff, 1941
Cerace lemeepauli Leme, in Leme & Tams, 1950
Cerace loxodes Meyrick, 1912
Cerace malayana Diakonoff, 1970
Cerace myriopa Meyrick, 1922
Cerace onustana Walker, 1863
Cerace sardias Meyrick, 1907
Cerace semnologa Diakonoff, 1976
Cerace stipatana Walker, 1863
Cerace tetraonis Butler, 1886
Cerace tonkinana Heppner, 2010
Cerace vietnamna Kawabe, 1993
Cerace xanthocosma Diakonoff, 1950
Cerace xanthothrix Diakonoff, 1950

See also
List of Tortricidae genera

References

External links
tortricidae.com

Ceracini
Tortricidae genera